Brierley Hill parliamentary constituency was located in the West Midlands of England. It returned one Member of Parliament (MP) to the House of Commons of the Parliament of the United Kingdom, elected by the first past the post system.

History 

The constituency was created for the 1950 general election, and abolished for the February 1974 general election.

Boundaries 
The seat was named after a town in the historic county of Staffordshire in the West Midlands of England.

It consisted of four local government areas, the Urban Districts of Amblecote, Brierley Hill, and Tettenhall as well as the Rural District of Seisdon, as they existed in 1948.

Before 1950 much of the area (Amblecote and Brierley Hill) had been part of the Kingswinford constituency. The rest (Tettenhall and Seisdon) were part of Cannock constituency.

In the redistribution which took effect in early 1974, this constituency was abolished. There had been changes in local government arrangements since 1950, so most of the area of the old seat had been divided between the County Boroughs of Dudley and Wolverhampton. The Brierley Hill ward of Dudley became part of the Dudley West constituency, whereas the Tettenhall Regis and Tettenhall Wightwick wards of Wolverhampton were part of the Wolverhampton South West seat. Seisdon became part of the South West Staffordshire division. Most of Amblecote had been included in the Worcestershire Municipal Borough of Stourbridge, so it became part of the Halesowen and Stourbridge parliamentary constituency.

Members of Parliament

Elections

Elections in the 1950s

Elections in the 1960s 

Anti-Common Market

Elections in the 1970s

See also
List of former United Kingdom Parliament constituencies

References 

 Boundaries of Parliamentary Constituencies 1885-1972, compiled and edited by F.W.S. Craig (Parliamentary Reference Publications 1972)
 British Parliamentary Election Results 1950-1973, compiled and edited by F.W.S. Craig (Parliamentary Research Services 1983)
 Who's Who of British Members of Parliament, Volume IV 1945-1979, edited by M. Stenton and S. Lees (Harvester Press 1981)
 

Parliamentary constituencies in Wolverhampton
Parliamentary constituencies in the West Midlands (county) (historic)
Parliamentary constituencies in Staffordshire (historic)
Constituencies of the Parliament of the United Kingdom established in 1950
Constituencies of the Parliament of the United Kingdom disestablished in 1974
Brierley Hill